Hakea ruscifolia, commonly known as the candle hakea,
is a shrub in the family Proteacea. It has fragrant white flowers, arching branches and spiky foliage. It is endemic to an area in the Peel, Wheatbelt South West, Great Southern and the Goldfields-Esperance regions of Western Australia.

Description
Usually branches grow in a columnar habit where the flowers envelop the stems. It blooms from December to June and produces sweetly scented white flowers in leaf axils on short lateral outer branchlets. Thickly crowded leaves are small and elliptic to obovate ending with a fine sharp point.

Taxonomy and naming
Hakea ruscifolia was first formally described by Jacques Labillardiere in 1805 and the description was published in Novae Hollandiae Plantarum Specimen. Named from the genus Ruscus - of the lily family and from the Latin - folium - leaf.

Distribution and habitat
Candle hakea is a widespread coastal and inland species from Eneabba to Augusta and in the east to Esperance. It grows in heath and scrubland on sand, gravelly clay and laterite.  A hardy ornamental species which is tolerant of moderate frost and a good understory shrub.

Conservation status
Hakea ruscifolia is classified as "not threatened" by the Western Australian Government Department of Parks and Wildlife.

References

ruscifolia
Eudicots of Western Australia
Plants described in 1805